All visitors to Comoros are required to have a visa. Nationals of any country can obtain a visa on arrival for a maximum stay of 45 days.

Based on the government website, visa fees are: 

30.00 euros or US$ 50.00 for stays of up to 45 days
Free of charge for transit visitors with a stay for a maximum of 24 hours

All visitors must hold a passport valid for 6 months and return or onward tickets.

See also
 Visa requirements for Comorian citizens

References 

Comoros
Foreign relations of the Comoros